"Holler" is a song by English girl group the Spice Girls, released as one of the two songs picked as the lead single from their third studio album, Forever (2000). The song was written by the Spice Girls, Rodney Jerkins, LaShawn Daniels and Fred Jerkins III, with Jerkins also producing it. The single was released as a double A-side single along with "Let Love Lead the Way" internationally, on 23 October 2000, except within the United States and Canada.

"Holler" is considered a more mature R&B song with lyrics talking about sexual pleasure. Critics gave "Holler" favourable reviews; though some thought it was too different from their previous sounds. However, most praised its funky groove and called it "a pleasant surprise", picking it as one of the best tracks on the album. The single topped the UK Singles Chart, while reaching the top 10 in 16 countries.

Background and release
After releasing "Goodbye" as their first single without member Geri Halliwell, in 1998, the band took a break and only came back to a recording studio in mid-1999, when Rodney Jerkins signed up to give their then-upcoming new album a tougher sound. Jerkins said, "I went out to dinner with a couple of the Spice Girls about a month and a half ago and they told me that they want me to, you know, do some work on their album, so I'm planning on going to London at the end of January, early February to work on the album, so it should be cool. I'm ready for it", adding that he hoped to bring an "urban, danceable" feel to the project: "It will still have a pop appeal, but the beats will be a little harder".

Group member Melanie C also commented that "It's a bit more mature, but it's not a mature album, but you know, a little bit more mature than the first two. Still very poppy, quite R&B based... we feel vocally a lot stronger now after the world tour and being a four-piece", adding that the group was "stronger after being apart for a while and we're very happy to have been back in the studio. This strength will show on this new album, which I think is our best yet". In December 1999, the girls performed a few new tracks during the Christmas in Spiceworld Tour, including the song, known at the time as "Holler Holler". In August 2000, it was revealed that the lead single from their third studio album would be a double A-side of "Holler" and "Let Love Lead the Way" with "Holler" being available for streaming through the band's official website on 11 September. The single was released in the United Kingdom on 23 October 2000 as a CD and cassette single. It was later sent to US contemporary hit radio on 24 October 2000.

Composition and lyrical interpretation

"Holler" was written by the members of the group Victoria Beckham, Melanie Brown, Emma Bunton, Melanie C, along with Rodney Jerkins, LaShawn Daniels and Fred Jerkins III. Production was handled by Jerkins under his stage name "Darkchild", while vocal production was done by LaShawn Daniels. "Holler" represents a shift from the bubblegum pop to a more mature pop and R&B sound, added with a "funky and up-beat". Lyrically, the song talks about making a boyfriend have a sexual pleasure, with the girls asking their boyfriends to fantasise being with them and to not be shy.

The song starts with the girls singing part of the chorus ("I wanna make you holler/Imagine us together/ Don't be afraid to play my game"). Then, Mel B tells her boyfriend not to take his time, inviting him to her bedroom, telling him he will enjoy his stay and that he will like her ways of arousing him. Later, Mel C tells that she'll submit to whatever he wants her to do, before the chorus kicks in. After the first chorus, Emma gives him directions on what to do and again, telling him not to be shy. Victoria then assures him that everything they do will be confidential. Next, the girls trade parts for the pre-chorus. After the second chorus, Jerkins interrupts and says "holler", adding a record-scratching to it, later, after repeating the second verse, the chorus is sung another two times to end the song.

Critical reception
"Holler" received generally favourable reviews from most music critics. Craig Seymour of Entertainment Weekly gave the track a B− rating, writing that the girls "sound like they really, really wanna be Destiny's Child", due to the song being produced by the same producer who produces Destiny's Child. Seymour also praised "its charms", praising the "easy yet funky groove, their exaggerated British accents (allowing them to rhyme holler with follow), and Jerkins' familiar slapping, kinetic beats". He also called it "their most compelling reason to dance since 'Say You'll Be There'." Stephen Thomas Erlewine of AllMusic simply picked the song as one of the best from Forever. Dave Morales of KHKS wrote that, "when I heard the song I was surprised, this thing is a home run!". Erik Bradley of B96-Chicago called it "one of the pleasant surprises of the 4th quarter", pointing out that, "'Holler' will bring the Spice Girls BACK all the way!".

Cuby of Z100-New York wrote the song "captures the sound of the moment for Top 40 radio. This is one song that deserves a slot on programmers' crowded 4th-quarter playlists." Whitney Matheson of USA Today called it similar to the works of Sister Sledge, Destiny's Child and Nu Shooz songs, writing that, "while the No Scrubs-y vibe briefly tempted me to shout a dirty word and bare my navel, styrofoam phrases such as 'Don't be afraid to play my game' are more Teletubby than T-Boz." While reviewing their Greatest Hits album, Nick Levine of Digital Spy wrote that "Jerkins' slick, stuttering R&B numbers from the Forever album ('Holler', 'Let Love Lead The Way') fail to capitalise on the girls' very British sense of mischief, but it functions brilliantly on two levels."

Retrospective reviews have been more negative. Dom Passantino of Stylus Magazine rated the single 3/10, saying the song is his "personal pick for the worst production job in musical history, ol' Darkchild took the most unique, epoch-defining, cultural maelstrom of a group he could find, and turned them into a facsimile of Fanmail-era TLC." Tom Ewing of Freaky Trigger said the song "shifts and shuffles in a competent, modish way but [Jerkins is not] not trying to change any games. Nor, to be fair, are the singers. The first question for any Spice Girl co-writer or producer should be how you accommodate  four (or five) very different voices, and give the sense that this is a group, not just women passing a mic around." He also described the intro, in which Jerkins mentions his name, the group's name, the song title and recording date as sounding dated: "Like 'Holler' needed to sound any more 2000."

Chart performance

On 24 October 2000, early sales figures reported that "Holler" was set to debut at number one on the UK Singles Chart. It sold 31,000 copies during the first day on sale. On 29 October 2000, the song debuted at the top of the charts, making the Spice Girls the first female group to attain nine number-one singles – only behind The Beatles, Elvis Presley, Cliff Richard and Madonna overall. The song became the eleventh UK number-one single with Melanie C as a songwriter, becoming the female artist with more number ones than any other in chart history. She held this record until Madonna surpassed it in 2006 with "Sorry". However, Melanie C remains the only female performer to top the charts as a solo artist, as part of a duo, quartet and quintet.

The single was also a success in Canada, reaching number two on the Canadian Singles Chart. In Australia, "Holler" debuted and peaked at number two on the ARIA Charts, becoming their highest charting-single since 1998's "Viva Forever". In New Zealand, the song debuted at number 47 on the RIANZ chart, remaining for a further week at the position. Later, it jumped to number 36, also remaining for two weeks at the position. Finally, after a week at number 29, the song rose to number two, becoming its peak position and the band's 10th consecutive top-ten single.

Music video
The music video was shot at Elstree Studios in Borehamwood, England, and was directed by Jake Nava. It was premiered through MuchMusic on 12 September. It begins zooming into a seemingly glass pyramid where the four girls are dancing on a square platform in a circle. Each of the four girls represents a different element. The first verse is sung by Brown, who represents fire as she sits in a dark room with fire rolling along the floor. Melanie C is seen levitating above cracked mud inside a room with wooden walls as the floor blooms into plant life; she represents earth. Bunton is wearing a short blue dress with a white coat and is dancing in a blue room under water with reflections bouncing off the walls. Finally Beckham, who embodies the element of air, is seen inside a wind tunnel playing with shiny prisms as they are blown by. All the girls are then seen together in the pyramid watching their respective male dancers (who are seen in each of their solo shots) dancing on the square platform. In Melanie C's solo room, a piece of wood is changed into a white python. Finally by the end of the song, all four girls join hands and form a beam of energy which then shoots out the top of the pyramid clearing up a cloudy stormy sky. The girls embrace in a hug and the video ends.

Live performances

The group premiered the song on their Christmas in Spiceworld tour in 1999, as one of the songs to be included on their then-upcoming third studio album. After that, the song was performed at the 2000 Brit Awards and was excluded from the TV broadcast due to technical problems arising during the performance but the song was heard on the live radio broadcast. During the ceremony, the Spice Girls received an award for Outstanding Contribution to Music. In order to promote Forever, the group performed it on British TV shows such as SMTV, Top of the Pops and CD:UK. They also performed the song at the 2000 MTV Europe Music Awards on 16 November 2000 in leather outfits, becoming their last live performance at an awards show before their breakup.

The Spice Girls performed the song on their first reunion tour, the Return of the Spice Girls in 2007 and 2008. They were dressed in dominatrix leather outfits, and had their dancers on leashes, on their knees. Jon Pareles from The New York Times considered this performance the "raciest stage moment" of the show. Though Geri Halliwell had returned to the group at this point, she did not take part in the performance of this song. For their second reunion tour, the Spice World - 2019 Tour, the song was performed with elements of "Sound Off"; it also marked the first time Halliwell performed the song live with the group. Holly Williams from The Independent gave a negative review for the performance, saying it remids you "why they stopped making music". She also called a "real misstep" when "over a marching band (very budget Beyoncé) they revive their old chant 'we know how we got this far/strength and courage in a Wonderbra'. As a vision of feminism, this maybe – maybe – passed muster in the Nineties, but sounds woefully out of step in 2019".

Track listings

 UK CD 1 / Australian CD 2 / South African CD single
 "Holler"  – 3:55
 "Let Love Lead the Way"  – 4:15
 "Holler"  – 8:30
 "Holler" 

 Japanese CD single
 "Holler"  – 3:55
 "Let Love Lead the Way"  – 4:15
 "Holler" 
 "Let Love Lead the Way" 
 "Let Love Lead the Way" 

 Digital EP
 "Holler"  – 3:55
 "Let Love Lead the Way"  – 4:15
 "Holler"  – 8:30
 "Holler"  – 8:30

Digital EP (MAW Remixes)
 "Holler"  – 7:10
 "Holler"  – 3:12
 "Holler"  – 6:46
 "Holler"  – 7:15

 European CD single "Holler"  – 3:55
 "Let Love Lead the Way"  – 4:15

 UK 12-inch single'''
 A1. "Holler"  – 8:30
 A2. "Holler"  – 3:12
 B1. "Holler"  – 7:10
 B2. "Holler"  – 6:46
 C1. "Holler"  – 8:30
 C2. "Holler"  – 7:15

Credits and personnel

Spice Girls – lyrics, vocals
David Adams - Backing vocals 
Rodney Jerkins – lyrics, production, audio mixing
LaShawn Daniels – lyrics, vocal production
Fred Jerkins III – lyrics

Harvey Mason Jr – Pro Tools
Brad Gilderman – recorder, audio mixing
Dave Russell – assistant
Ian Robertson – assistant

Published by Rodney Jerkins Productions/EMI Music Publishing Ltd., Fred Jerkins Music Publishing/Famous Music Corp, EMI Music Publishing (WP) Ltd.

Charts

Weekly charts

Year-end charts

Certifications

Release history

Notes

References

1999 songs
2000 singles
British contemporary R&B songs
Music videos directed by Jake Nava
Number-one singles in Scotland
Song recordings produced by Rodney Jerkins
Songs written by Emma Bunton
Songs written by Fred Jerkins III
Songs written by LaShawn Daniels
Songs written by Mel B
Songs written by Melanie C
Songs written by Rodney Jerkins
Songs written by Victoria Beckham
Spice Girls songs
UK Singles Chart number-one singles
Virgin Records singles